The 1978 UCI Track Cycling World Championships were the World Championship for track cycling. They took place in Munich, West Germany in 1978. Twelve events were contested, 10 for men (3 for professionals, 7 for amateurs) and 2 for women.

Medal summary

Medal table

See also
 1978 UCI Road World Championships

References

Uci Track Cycling World Championships, 1978
Track cycling
UCI Track Cycling World Championships by year
International sports competitions hosted by West Germany